Tribalus (Eutribalus) colombius, is a species of clown beetle found in many Oriental countries including India, Sri Lanka, Myanmar, Taiwan, Vietnam, Philippines, and Australia.

References 

Histeridae
Insects of Sri Lanka
Insects described in 1864